Vũ Cát Tường (born October 2, 1992) is a Vietnamese singer-songwriter and record producer. During the music career, she has received 6 nominations, won 2 Dedication Music Award and an inclusion on Forbes Vietnam 2018 30 Under 30 list, along with many other awards.

Dedication Music Award 

! 
|-
|align=center rowspan=2 |2014
| "Vết mưa"
| Song of the year
| 
|
|-
| rowspan=2 | Vũ Cát Tường
| New artist of the year
| 
| 
|-
|align=center| 2015
| Musician of the year
| 
|
|-
|align=center| 2017
| "Mơ"
| Song of the year
| 
|
|-
|align=center rowspan=2|2019
| Vũ Cát Tường
| Musician of the year
| 
|
|-
| "Stardom"
| Album of the year
|  
|
|-
|}

Keeng Young Awards

! 	
|-
|align=center rowspan="4" | 2017
| rowspan="2" | Vũ Cát Tường 
| Best artist of the year
| 
|
|-
| Composer has the most loved songs of the year
| 
|
|-
| "Cô gái ngày hôm qua"
| OST of the year
| 
|
|-
| "Em ơi" (Vũ Cát Tường ft. Hakoota Dũng Hà)
| Cooperative song
| 
|
|-
|align=center rowspan="9"| 2018
| rowspan="4"| Vũ Cát Tường
| Best artist of the year
| 
|
|-
| The most favorite singer
| 
|
|-
| The most favorite musician
| 
| 
|-
| Artists of innovation
| 
|
|-
| "Leader"
| MV of the year
| 
|
|-
| Stardom
| Album of the year
| 
|
|-
| rowspan="2"|"You Are Mine"
| Ca khúc của năm
| 
|
|-
| Ca khúc nhạc Pop
| 
|
|-
| "Leader"
| Ca khúc nhạc Rap/Hiphop/R&B 
| 
|
|-
|}

The Voice of Vietnam

! 
|-
|align=center| 2013
| Vũ Cát Tường
| The runner-up season 2
| 
|
|}

ELLE Women in Music

! 
|-
|align=center| 2014
| Vũ Cát Tường
| One of four honored female singers
| 
|
|}

The Favorite Songs

! 
|-
|align=center | 2014
| "Vết mưa"
| Favorite song of month in liveshow on January
| 
|
|-
|align=center rowspan="5" | 2015
| "Anh và Anh"
| Favorite song of month in liveshow on March
| 
|
|-
| rowspan="2" | "Phai"
| Favorite song of month in liveshow on May
| 
|
|-
| The most effective music mix in liveshow on May
| 
|
|-
| rowspan="3" | "Mơ"
| Favorite song of month in liveshow on December
| 
| 
|-
| Impressive song in liveshow on December
|  
|
|-
|align=center | 2016
| The favorite song of the Month in liveshow on January
| 
|
|}

Vietnamese songs

! 
|-
|align=center rowspan="4" | 2014
| rowspan="2" | Vũ Cát Tường
| Effective performing singer with the song "Yêu xa" in liveshow on August
| 
|
|-
| Passive and creative with the song " Yêu xa" in liveshow on August
| 
|
|-
| rowspan="2" | "Yêu xa"
| Favorite song
| 
|
|-
| The song voted the press council
| 
|
|-
|align=center | 2015
| "Phai"
| Song voted by viewers
| 
|
|}

Green Wave

|-
|align=center rowspan="2" | 2014
| rowspan="5" | Vũ Cát Tường
| Prospective singer
| 
|-
| Top 10 composers of the year
| 
|-
|align=center | 2017
| Award of dedication
| 
|-
|align=center rowspan="2" | 2018
| Top 10 most favorite singer
| 
|-
| Female artist of the year
| 
|}

YAN Vpop 20 Awards

! 
|-
|align=center rowspan="2" | 2014
| rowspan="3" | Vũ Cát Tường
| New artist of the year
| 
|
|-
| Top 20 singers of the year
| 
|
|-
|align=center | 2015
| Top 20 singers of the year
| 
|
|}

Zing Music Awards

|-
|align=center | 2014
| Vũ Cát Tường
| Prospective singer
| 
|}

HTV Awards

! 
|-
|align=center rowspan="2" | 2015
| rowspan="4" | Vũ Cát Tường
| The most favorite singer
| 
|
|-
| The most favorite musician
| 
| 
|-
|align=center rowspan="2" | 2016
| The most favorite singer
| 
|
|-
| The most favorite musician
| 
|
|}

VTV The song I love

! 
|-
|align=center | 2016
| "Mơ"
| The Gold Music Video
| 
|
|}

Mai Vàng Awards

! 
|-
|align=center rowspan="3" | 2016
| "Mơ"
| Song of the year
| 
|
|-
| rowspan="5" | Vũ Cát Tường
| Top 10 artists of the year
| 
|
|-
| The most favorite singer of the year
| 
|
|-
|align=center rowspan="2" | 2017
| Top 10 artists of the year
| 
|
|-
| The most favorite singer of the year
| 
|
|-
|align=center | 2018
| The most favorite singer of the year
| 
|
|}

Her World Young Woman Achiever

! 
|-
|align=center rowspan="2" | 2016
| rowspan="2" | Vũ Cát Tường
| Composer award by Art Board
| 
|
|-
| Composer award voted by readers
| 
|
|}

VLive Awards

! 
|-
|align=center | 2017
| rowspan="2" | Vũ Cát Tường
| Best Female Artist
| 
|
|-
|align=center | 2018
| Artist of the year 
| 
|
|}

Ấn tượng VTV

! 
|-
|align=center | 2017
| Vũ Cát Tường
| Impressive singer of the year
| 
|
|}

Fitness and Entertainment Award

! 
|-
|align=center | 2017
| rowspan="2" | Vũ Cát Tường
| People's Choice Most Inspirational #IAMMORE
| 
|-
|align=center | 2018
| Fitness & Entertainment Icon of the Year 
| 
|
|}

Forbes Việt Nam

! 
|-
|align=center | 2018
| Vũ Cát Tường
| Top 30 Under 30
| 
|
|}

Ngôi sao của năm

! 
|-
|align=center | 2018
| Vũ Cát Tường
| Star of the year
| 
|
|}

WeChoice Awards

! 
|-
|align=center | 2014
| Vũ Cát Tường
| Best female artist of the year
|
|
|-
|align=center | 2016
| "Mơ"
| MV of the year
| 
|
|-
|align=center | 2018
| Vũ Cát Tường
| Artists have outstanding activities
| 
|
|}

Other awards

References

Vu Cat Tuong